is a Japanese festival celebrated from 20 to 21 July in Tsuchizaki (Tsuchizakiminato), the port area of Akita City, Akita Prefecture, Japan.

Approximately 20 floats are dedicated and parade.

Its rites centre on the Shinmeisha shrine. Each neighbourhood contributes a float decorated with giant figures. In 1997 it was designated an Important Intangible Folk Cultural Property.

The back of The Float and The Music Band

July 20th

July 21st

Access 
The exit station is Tsuchizaki Station (north next of Akita Station).

Walk straight from the exit of the station and you can soon see Tsuchizaki Shinmeisha Shrine on your left. And little more walk leads to the main street of The Float Festival.

See also 

Matsuri
List of Important Intangible Folk Cultural Properties
Important Intangible Cultural Properties of Japan

References

External links

 Tsuchizaki Shinmeisha Float Festival homepage

Festivals in Akita Prefecture
Important Intangible Folk Cultural Properties
Akita (city)
Festivals in Japan